Rysbek Jumabayev is a revered manaschi (reciter of the Kyrgyz epic Manas). He has performed around the world, including in New York and London, and parts of his recitation of Manas have been recorded by the Aga Khan Music Initiative in Central Asia.

References

External links
 Rysbek Jumabaev Rock, Paper, Scissors World Music 
 

Kyrgyzstani male singers
Kyrgyzstani folk singers
Living people
Manaschis
Year of birth missing (living people)